"Chiisana Boku e" (To the Small Me) is Jun Shibata's 9th single. It was released on November 25, 2004, and peaked at #22.

Track listing
Chiisana boku e (ちいさなぼくへ; To the Small Me)
Hikari (光; Light)

Charts

References

External links
https://web.archive.org/web/20161030094458/http://www.shibatajun.com/— Shibata Jun Official Website

2004 singles
Jun Shibata songs
2004 songs